Baetens may refer to:

  (born 1957), Belgian writer, poet and critic
  (born 1964), Belgian conductor and clarinetist
 Bob Baetens (1930–2016), Belgian rower
 Melody Baetens (born 1979), staff writer for The Detroit News
 Pascal Baetens (born 1963), Belgian photographer
 Veerle Baetens (born 1978), Flemish actress
 Seppe Baetens (born 1989), Belgian volleyball player

See also 
Baeten